The 1995 World Table Tennis Championships – Swaythling Cup (men's team) was the 43rd edition of the men's team championship.  

China won the gold medal defeating Sweden 3–2 in the final. South Korea won the bronze medal defeating France in the bronze medal play off.

Medalists

Final stage knockout phase

Quarter finals

Semifinals

Third-place play off

Final

See also
List of World Table Tennis Championships medalists

References

-